Sini Maaria Suvi-Anne Siimes (born 1 June 1963, in Helsinki) is a former chair of the Finnish Left Alliance. She quit the party in 2006 because she did not want to support the party's former taistoists (orthodox pro-Soviet communists).

Before her political career, she had several short teaching posts in University of Helsinki and Kauppakorkeakoulu and she was planning a scientist / researcher career in economic sciences
Her political career started in local politics in Pohja (a small town in South-Western Finland)

She was chairperson of the Finnish Left Alliance 1998–2006 and was a member of the Finnish Parliament (Eduskunta) from 1999 to 2007. She served as a member of the Foreign Affairs Committee and a delegate for Finland in the Nordic Council. In the two Cabinets of Paavo Lipponen (1995–2003), Siimes served as the Coordinate Minister for Culture (1998–1999) and as the Minister of Finance (1999–2003). From 1995 to 2000, she was a deputy member of the European Union Committee on Regional Development.

In March 2006 she resigned from the Left Alliance, stating she didn't want to support the election of former taistoists like Jaakko Laakso to the Parliament of Finland in the next elections 2007 and that she could not continue in politics after she had not succeeded in making the Left Alliance what she termed a "modern" leftist political party with "modern European attitudes" and practices.

In her book (Politiikan julkisivu) published after she left politics in March 2007, she tells in detail what made her to quit her very successful political career (in election 1999 over 16,000 personal votes and 2003 over 17,000 votes, a number that showed that she was one of the most popular politicians in Finnish political life 1999–2003)

In the 2009 European elections, Siimes endorsed Risto Penttilä, a National Coalition Party candidate.

Siimes is now working as Director General of Pharma Industry Finland.

She was appointed Chairman of the Board of Veikkaus (the Finnish National Lottery) on 16 March 2011.

Siimes has a licentiate (advanced degree) in economics.

Publications 
Amerikan päiväkirja ja muita kirjoituksia (2000)
Politiikan piilokuvat (2002)
Politiikan julkisivu (2007)

References

1963 births
Living people
Politicians from Helsinki
Left Alliance (Finland) politicians
Ministers of Finance of Finland
Ministers of Education of Finland
Members of the Parliament of Finland (1999–2003)
Members of the Parliament of Finland (2003–07)
Women government ministers of Finland
Women members of the Parliament of Finland
21st-century Finnish women politicians